My-Ukraina is a Ukrainian news television channel owned by Igor Petrenko. The channel was founded in October 2022 and is staffed by personnel of the former Ukraine (TV channel).

On October 13, 2022, the State Committee for Television and Radio-broadcasting in Ukraine confirmed to consider the application of Ми — Україна LLC for the issuance of a national TV broadcasting license.

The channel started broadcasting on YouTube on October 18, 2022. On October 19, 2022, the National Council on Television and Radio Broadcasting issued a satellite license to Ми — Україна LLC, the license was issued for 10 years. On November 3, the National Television and Radio Broadcasting Council of Ukraine issued a temporary permit to the company to broadcast on the national MX-2 of the DVB-T2 digital terrestrial network, and it started broadcasting terrestrially on November 7, 2022. It replaced the closed Ukraine 24 channel for the period of martial law. The station plans to also broadcast entertainment formats after the end of the war.

On November 8, 2022, the TV channel joined the "United News" telethon.

At the moment, around 200 employees are working for My Ukraina.

Leaders 

 Igor Petrenko
 Yuriy Sugak

References 

Television stations in Ukraine 
Ukrainian-language television stations in Ukraine 
Television channels and stations established in 2022 
2022 establishments in Ukraine